The 1999 Copa del Rey was the 63rd edition of the Spanish basketball Cup. It was organized by the ACB and was held in Valencia at the Pabellón Municipal Fuente de San Luis between January 29 and February 1, 1999. The winning team was TAU Cerámica.

Bracket

Final

MVP of the Tournament:  Elmer Bennett

See also
ACB
Copa del Rey de Baloncesto

External links
Results and stats of Copa del Rey 1999 
Linguasport

Copa del Rey de Baloncesto
1998–99 in Spanish basketball